Father to Son is a 2018 Taiwanese drama film directed and written by Hsiao Ya-chuan. The production companies behind the film are Bit Production in association with Pixelfly Digital Effects.

The film was produced by Shih-Wei Chang, Hou Hsiao-hsien, Jui-Lan Hsiao and Michael Wang. The music was composed by Chris Hou and Summer Lei, and it was produced by Ivan Linn. The film was distributed by Ablaze Image.

Plot 
Van Pao-Te, who is now 60 years old, finds himself suffering from a serious illness. Instead of getting treatment, he decides to go to Japan to look for his father who abandoned him 50 years ago with the company of his son. At the same time, a young man from Hong Kong who is somehow related to Van Pao-Te's past comes to Taiwan. Two unknown journeys of self-reconciliation begin.

Cast 
 Michael Huang as Fan Pao-Te
 Aria Wang as Kuo Yu-Chin
 Fu Meng-po as Fan Ta-Chi
 Kaiser Chuang as Young Fan Pao-Te
 Jag Huang as Fan Pao-Te's Father  
 Samuel Ku as Newman   
 Cheng-Ling Wen as Young Kuo Yu-Chin 
 Daniel Chen as Di

Release 
Father to Son premiered in the Netherlands at the International Film Festival Rotterdam on January 29, 2018, followed by a Spanish premiere at the Las Palmas de Gran Canaria International Film Festival on April 8, a premiere in Hungary at the Titanic International Filmpresence Festival on April 12, and a Taiwanese premiere at the Taipei Film Festival on June 28.

Awards

The 20th Taipei Film Awards

The 55th Golden Horse Awards

References 

2018 films